Chala is a census town in Valsad district  in the state of Gujarat, India.

Demographics
 India census, Chala had a population of 16,244. Males constitute 58% of the population and females 42%. Chala has an average literacy rate of 78%, higher than the national average of 59.5%; with male literacy of 83% and female literacy of 72%. 14% of the population is under 6 years of age.

References

Cities and towns in Valsad district